Herman Witte (7 December 1666 — 24 March 1728) was the Bishop of Turku from 1721 to 1728.

Biography
Witte was born on 7 December 1666 in Daugavgrīva, Riga, in what was the Swedish Empire and is present-day Latvia. He was educated at the Lyceum in Riga between 1682 and 1688 under the tutorship of Johann Uppendorff. he then studied at the University of Wittenberg and then in September 1691 was appointed an assistant professor in the Faculty of Philosophy. In 1695 he became the vicar of Stettin in present-day Poland. On 11 July 1707 he was appointed the superintendent of Saaremaa (present-day Estonia). After Sweden lost the Great Northern War of the Baltic States, Witte moved to Sweden in 1710. In February 1710, Witte appealed to the National Council for a post in Sweden and the Council initially decided to appoint him to the vacant bishopric of Växjö. However, the decision to appoint the German-born Witte, who had insufficient knowledge of Swedish, raised strong oppositions and the Council withdrew its decision. Nonetheless, Witte managed to become the German-speaking chaplain of Ulrika Eleonora.

In 1721 he was appointed Bishop of Turku. Archbishop Mathias Steuchius consecrate him bishop in Uppsala Cathedral on 8 October 1721. He firmly resisted Pietism and pursued purity. As bishop he frequently inspected the congregations and closely monitored the school system, and examined priests and school teachers to make sure they were performing their teaching duties in a proper manner. Witte was also appointed prosecutor at the University of Turku and worked to re-open the Royal Academy of Turku, which happened in 1722. He died in Turku on 28 March 1728.

References

Lutheran archbishops and bishops of Turku
1666 births
1728 deaths
Clergy from Riga